Non me lo dire! is a 1940 Italian "white-telephones" comedy film directed by Mario Mattoli and starring Erminio Macario.

Plot
Italy, early 1940s. A rich and noble man, returning from America, has the unpleasant surprise of being dirt poor. Its magnificent castle is impounded and he agrees to become the guide allowed visitors to admire.

Cast
 Erminio Macario - Michele Colombelli, marchese di Castel Perrone (as Macario)
 Vanda Osiris - Priscilla (as Vanda Osiri)
 Silvana Jachino - Luisella
 Enzo Biliotti - Il maggiordomo Battista
 Tino Scotti - Il matto
 Guglielmo Barnabò - L'organizzatore dei giochi di società
 Nino Pavese - Joe, L'autista
 Luigi Erminio D'Olivo - Il capo cameriere (as Erminio D'Olivo)
 Cesare Fantoni - Il proprietario del negozio
 Vinicio Sofia - Un cliente del negozio
 Guglielmo Sinaz - Il primo falso creditore

References

External links

1940 films
Italian comedy films
1940s Italian-language films
1940 comedy films
Italian black-and-white films
Films directed by Mario Mattoli
1940s Italian films